Łukasz Garguła (born 25 February 1981 in Żagań, Poland) is a Polish retired footballer who played as a central midfielder.

Club career
Garguła started his footballing career in Piast Iłowa and played a three seasons for Polar Wrocław.

GKS Bełchatów signed him in 2002 and in 2005 he managed to ascend with the team to the Ekstraklasa (the premier division in Poland). In the 06–07 season the team finished second in the league.

In 2009, he signed for Wisła Kraków. On July 1, 2015, Garguła signed a 1-year contract with Miedz Legnica and an option on a year extension.

In July 2019, Garguła joined Lechia Zielona Góra.

International career
On 2 September 2006, Garguła made his international debut in a match against Finland, a match which Poland lost 1–3 and where he also scored his first and only goal for his country.

He was called up to participate at Euro 2008 by Leo Beenhakker, however he was the only Polish player, along with Górnik Zabrze defender Michał Pazdan, who did not play in the whole tournament.

Statistics

Club

International

International goals

Honours

Wisła Kraków
 Ekstraklasa: 2010–11

References

External links
 
 
 

1981 births
Living people
Polish footballers
Poland youth international footballers
Poland international footballers
UEFA Euro 2008 players
Ekstraklasa players
I liga players
III liga players
Polar Wrocław players
GKS Bełchatów players
Wisła Kraków players
Miedź Legnica players
Lechia Zielona Góra players
People from Żagań
Sportspeople from Lubusz Voivodeship
Association football midfielders